Procordulia smithii, commonly known as Smith's dragonfly or the ranger dragonfly, is a species of  dragonfly that is endemic to New Zealand, as is its close relative Procordulia grayi.

New Zealand dragonflies became of interest during Cook's voyages, but the first collection that contained dragonflies was not established until 1842. George Hudson made large contributions to dragonfly entomology in New Zealand, but he had difficulty differentiating between P. smithii and P. grayi due to similarities in appearance.

The order Odonata has one of the stronger fossil records in comparison with other insects. Only a limited number of studies have been conducted on the effects of biogeographical taxa. Furthermore, they state that distribution patterns of taxa appear to correlate with climatological zones. A variety of niches have been found in tropical forests, as it has been established that tropical regions currently have the largest number of dragonfly species which could indicate distribution patterns. This is also interesting because P. smithii are abundant in the South Island and the lower North Island, suggesting the species thrives in cooler environments. Rowe (1987) supports this theory as is stated that due P. smithii eggs being subject to freezing temperatures during glacial advances.

Description

Procordulia smithii has globe-like eyes that touch and dominate the head. In males, the eyes are green with slight iridescence, while the female eyes are brown with no iridescence. P. smithii has eyes which are very capable of detecting movement and change, with abilities of radar-like senses.

Procordulia smithii has a long, tubular abdomen that is slightly flattened and black or dark brown. Rowe describes that the intersegmental membranes of the abdomen "often appear bright pale-yellow, producing the appearance of narrow, illuminated, widely separated transverse stripes down the abdomen when the species is in flight."

P. smithii has spiny, thin legs that have the ability to capture prey and carry it distances whilst flying. Norberg (1972) discusses the ample wing flexibility of P. smithii due to a nodus which is like a slight bend halfway in the wing. During flight, the wing can flex and bend around the nodus. The wing’s pterostigma aids in stabilizing the wing. P. smithii is typically 46-50 mm in length. Rowe notes that legs found closer to the body are brown in color, whereas the legs further away from the body are black. Rowe also comments that taxa found in the Chatham Islands have been found to have coloring variations from mainland species.

Distribution
Though Procordulia smithii is currently endemic to New Zealand, the species has strong links to Australian species of dragonfly. Rowe (1987) describes P. smithii as having similarities to the Hemicordulia-Procordulia group which is abundant throughout Australia and the Pacific. Rowe (1987) states that P. smithii is likely to have colonized in New Zealand during an interglacial period.

Procordulia smithii is found only in New Zealand. It has been found on coastal islands, extending to Little Barrier Island and the Chatham Island. It is particularly abundant in the Canterbury region of the South Island.

Rowe (1987) established that Procordulia smithii has been found throughout New Zealand and especially prevalent in the South Island and southern areas of the North Island. However, Rowe (1987) also notes that P. smithii has been notably absent from northern parts of the North Island and that further investigation is necessary. Additionally, Rowe (1987) states that P. smithii taxa have undergone changes in abundance since 1950.

P. smithii can be found near inland wetlands, streams, creeks, swamps, peatlands, marshes, bogs, waterfalls and fens. Larvae are found less often in waters and streams but are more commonly found in bulrush beds and small bog ponds in close proximity to streams and pools. Larvae and exuviae are also commonly found in backwaters and flood ponds of streams. Whereas adults are typically found in streams.(Rowe, 1987). Rowe (1987) further supports this as exuviae of P. smithii were largely found in close proximity to ponded areas. Marinov (2015), publishes that P. smithii can also be found in grasslands that are as far away as five kilometers from the nearest source of water.

Life cycle/phenology
A pupal stage between larval and adult stage does not occur within the P. smithii species. Furthermore, Deacon (1979) concludes that it takes four years for Procordulia smithii to complete their life cycle. Rowe (1987) reports that P. smithii taxa lay their eggs in shallow, still water. Rowe (1987) notes that lack of study has led to a lower understanding of the maturation period of all dragonfly species. It is suggested that further study is needed in this area by means of marking taxa and recapturing them upon arrival in water habitats after maturing period.

P. smithii at the larval stage are restricted to freshwater and brackish waters. It is not until they have developed wing covers halfway through their growth stage that they leave these waters. Ware and Herrera (2012) state that perhaps one of their most notable attributes is their mating behaviors. P. smithii mate in a tandem-like position with the male and female engaging in a copulatory wheel, which is easily distinguishable for its heart shaped formation. This form of copulation involves indirect fertilization as at the base of their abdomens, male and female taxa have secondary genitalia (Ware and Herrera, 2012). Rowe (1987) stipulates that P. smithii has two times of the year where it is particularly abundant – late December to early January, and the latter part of February.

Diet and foraging
The daily feeding patterns of Procordulia smithii males located in Cass, Canterbury, migrate about 0.7 km. Individuals migrate to nearby river flats and return to patrol their territory for the next morning.  Odonates usually prey on small flying insects and in both larval and adult stages, regarded as skilled and capable hunters. Odonates are also considered to be top predators within freshwater ecosystems. While a lion alone may catch its prey 25% of the time, but falls severely short in comparison to dragonfly species which are thought to catch its prey 95% of the time.

Predators, parasites and diseases
Procordulia smithii is not threatened and is classed in the ‘Least concern’ category. P. smithii, like many other species are threatened by climate change, particularly individuals residing in high elevation which may be challenged without a suitable habitat. Furthermore, taxa that reside in warmer, tropical climates may face deforestation and increasing temperatures which could eventuate to species loss 
Dragonfly adults are largely preyed on by various species of trout and spiders. It is also stated that mites are likely to affect dragonflies.
There is little to no information regarding any parasites and diseases that affects P. smithii and further study is recommended to further understand this species. This species requires further investigation as to what climate change effects will have on P. smithii.

References

Corduliidae
Odonata of New Zealand
Endemic fauna of New Zealand
Insects described in 1846
Taxa named by Adam White (zoologist)
Endemic insects of New Zealand